Boniface Tshosa Setlalekgosi (14 September 1927 – 25 January 2019) was the Roman Catholic bishop of the Diocese of Gaborone, Botswana, from 1981 until 2009. Setlalekgosi became an ordained priest in 1963. He succeeded Urban Charles Joseph Murphy to become the second Roman Catholic bishop in Botswana's history.

References

1927 births
2019 deaths
20th-century Roman Catholic bishops in Botswana
Roman Catholic bishops of Gaborone
Botswana Roman Catholic bishops
21st-century Roman Catholic bishops in Botswana